The Empire Slovak Open (previously known as the Empire Trnava Cup) is a tournament for professional female tennis players played on outdoor clay courts. The event is classified as a $100,000 ITF Women's Circuit tournament and has been held in Trnava, Slovakia, since 2009.

Past finals

Singles

Doubles

External links 
 ITF search
  

ITF Women's World Tennis Tour
Clay court tennis tournaments
Tennis tournaments in Slovakia
Recurring sporting events established in 2009
Spring (season) events in Slovakia
2009 establishments in Slovakia